Vincent Wong Wing Ki (born Wong Shu Ki (黃書棋); 18 March 1990) is a retired badminton player of Chinese-Indonesian descent who represented Hong Kong.

Name change 
Wong Wing Ki was born Wong Shu Ki (黃書棋), but he changed his name when he was 17. "Shu" is homophonous to another word meaning "to lose" in Chinese, and he was told to change it.

Education 
Wong Wing Ki was a student at La Salle College. He quit school after Form 3 to concentrate on a badminton career.

Career

2011 Denmark Open 
On 19 October, Wong beat Lee Hyun-il in the first round by 10–21, 21–16 and 21–14, then on 20 October, Wong Wing Ki pulled off the biggest upset of the 2011 Denmark Open when he defeated four-time world champion Lin Dan of China 21–10, 17–21, 21–19 out of the competition and progressed through to the quarter-finals.  Hong Kong head coach Tim He Yiming said, "The result will have a great impact on Wong, as he is challenging for a place in next year's Olympic Games." In the third round, Wong Wing Ki lost to Sho Sasaki 21–15, 15–21, 7–21.

2012 German Open 
In the 2012 German Open, Wong Wing Ki defeated Sony Dwi Kuncoro to proceed to the last 16. He was then in superb form to claim a 21–9, 21–17, victory against 2010 World Champion Chen Jin, which set up with a quarter-final match with Jan O Jorgensen. Jorgensen ended the giant-killing run of Wong Wing Ki when he defeated the Hong Kong shuttler 21–17, 21–11.

2012 London Olympics 
Wong Wing Ki was one of eighteen players seeded in the 2012 London Olympics Men's singles tournament. Wong Wing Ki won through into the knockout stages of the men's singles event after he overcame France's Brice Leverdez 21–11, 21–16 for his second win in a row in the group stage. Wong then crashed out of the last 16, as he was defeated by third seed Chen Long, 21–17, 21–17. The second set was tied seven times, but several of the shuttle's bounces on the net didn't go Wong's way. Wong said he felt his attack from the backcourt was lethal, but he said Chen was a stronger player on the net.

2022: Final match and retirement 
Wong, who had not played in the international circuit for 2 years due to the COVID-19 pandemic, announced that the World Championships would be his final tournament. In the opening round, he defeated Belgium's Julien Carraggi 15–21, 22–20, 21–11, earning him a spot in the round of 32, facing off compatriot Ng Ka Long. The following day, Wong lost to Ng 16–21, 9–21 in straight games, ending his 17-year badminton career.

Life after retirement 
Months after his retirement, Wong joined Viktor Axelsen's North American Tour in Canada and played an exhibition match against the World No.1 Axelsen, which he lost in straight games.

Achievements

Asian Junior Championships 
Boys' singles

BWF Grand Prix (1 title, 4 runners-up)
The BWF Grand Prix had two levels, the Grand Prix and Grand Prix Gold. It was a series of badminton tournaments sanctioned by the Badminton World Federation (BWF) and played between 2007 and 2017.

Men's singles

  BWF Grand Prix Gold tournament
  BWF Grand Prix tournament

BWF International Challenge/Series (1 runner-up)
Men's singles

  BWF International Challenge tournament
  BWF International Series tournament

Record against selected opponents 
Includes results against Olympic quarterfinals, Worlds semifinalists, and Super Series finalists, as well as all Olympic opponents.

  Chen Jin 1–3
  Chen Long 0–3
  Du Pengyu 1–2
  Lin Dan 1–2
  Wang Zhengming 0–3
  Hsieh Yu-hsing 2–0
  Chou Tien-chen 3–0
  Peter Gade 0–2
  Jan Ø. Jørgensen 0–5
  Viktor Axelsen 2–2
  Brice Leverdez 3–0
  Marc Zwiebler 2–0
  Hu Yun 2–1
  Parupalli Kashyap 0–1
  Srikanth K. 1–1
  Taufik Hidayat 0–6
  Sony Dwi Kuncoro 1–0
  Tommy Sugiarto 1–2
  Simon Santoso 1–4
  Sho Sasaki 0–1
  Kenichi Tago 0–3
  Lee Hyun-il 2–8
  Son Wan-ho 1–1
  Lee Chong Wei 0–8
  Liew Daren 1–1
  Boonsak Ponsana 1–4
  Edwin Ekiring 1–0

References

External links 
 WONG Wing Ki Vincent – Biography. Guangzhou 2010 Asian Games. Retrieved 26 October 2011.
 Wong Wing Ki profile on Hong Kong Olympic Committee official website

Hong Kong male badminton players
1990 births
Living people
Hong Kong people of Indonesian descent
Indonesian people of Chinese descent
Indonesian Cantonese people
Badminton players at the 2012 Summer Olympics
Olympic badminton players of Hong Kong
Badminton players at the 2010 Asian Games
Badminton players at the 2014 Asian Games
Badminton players at the 2018 Asian Games
Asian Games competitors for Hong Kong